The Miss GEICO offshore powerboat racing team was founded by John Haggin who retired from the team in 2010. Today Miss GEICO is owned and operated by AMF Riviera Beach which is owned by Marc Granet, Scotty Begovich, Scott Colton, Gary Stray, Gary Goodell and sponsored by the American insurance company GEICO. Miss GEICO is one of the fastest offshore powerboats in the world. The boat has had many incarnations. That boat caught fire during testing on June 30, 2012, in Sarasota, Florida, and burned to the waterline (nobody was injured). 

When it was driven by Granet and throttled by Begovich, Miss GEICO captured five consecutive World Championships in 2006, 2007, 2008, 2009 and 2010.

In 2020, racing legend Travis Pastrana joined the cockpit with Steve Curtis, a seasoned British offshore racer.

Accomplishments
 2010 OPA World Champion, Extreme Class
 2009 SBI World Champion, Turbine Class
 2009 OPA National Champion
 2009 World Speed Record - Miami to Palm Beach in 45:49
 2009 SBI World Kilo Record Run, Turbine Class - 188.5 mph
 2008 SBI World Champion, Turbine Class
 2008 OSS National Champion, Turbine Extreme Class
 2008 OPA National Points Champion, Extreme Class
 2008 OPA Miss GEICO Triple Crown Champion, Extreme Class
 2008 SBI Florida State Champion, Turbine Class
 2008 World Speed Biofuel Record between Annapolis and Baltimore
 2007 SBI World Champion, Turbine Class
 2007 OPA World Champion, Extreme Class
 2007 OSS World Champion, Turbine Extreme Class
 2007 OSS National Champion, Turbine Extreme Class
 2007 World Speed Record between Annapolis and Baltimore - 14 minutes and seven seconds
 2007 'Chattanooga Mile' Speed Record - 188.285 mph
 2006 OSS World Champion, Turbine Extreme Class
 2006 OPA/POPRA World Champion, Extreme Class
 2006 OSS National Champion, Turbine Extreme Class
 2006 Class Champion - LOTO Shootout
 2006 King of the Delta Pacific Offshore POPRA

Specifications

Miss GEICO #113
Builder: Victory
Materials: Carbon, Kevlar, S Glass
Length: 47 feet
Weight: 11,750
Engines: Mercury Racing 1100 Comp
Top Speed: 160+
Status: Active

2006 Miss GEICO Mystic #113
Builder: Mystic Powereboats
Materials: Carbon, Kevlar, S Glass
Length: 50 feet
Weight: 10,000 lbs
Type: Jet-A
Engines: Whispering Turbines Inc. T-53 703 series
Horsepower: 2100 x 2
Top Speed: 210+ mph
Status: Total loss

2007 Miss GEICO MTI #113
Builder: Marine Technologies Incorporated
Materials: Composite, Carbon, Epoxy
Length: 44 feet
Beam: 10’ 6
Weight: 10,000 lbs
Fuel: 500 Gal Capacity
Type: Jet- A
Drives: BPM
Engines: Turbine Marine Inc's, Lycoming T-53 703 series
Horsepower: 1850 x 2
Top Speed: 195+ mph
Status: Show boat

2004 Miss GEICO Victory #113
Builder: Victory Hull
Materials: Composite, Carbon, Epoxy
Length: 44 feet
Beam: 11’ 10
Weight: 9,500 lbs
Fuel: 265 Gal Capacity
Type: Jet- A
Drives: BPM
Engines: Mercury Racing twin 1650 piston power
Horsepower: 1650 x 2
Top Speed: 187+ mph

2009 Caveman #113
Builder: Cigarette
Model: Top Gun 38
Materials: Fiberglass
Length: 38 feet
Weight: 9,500 lbs
Drives: Mercury Bravo XR Sportmaster
Engines: Mercury 525 EFI
Horsepower: 1050
Top Speed: 88+ mph

2008 Safety Boat #113
Builder: Cigarette
Material: S Glass
Length: 32 feet
Weight: 8,000 lbs
Engines: Mercury Racing 3.2 Stroker
Horsepower: 625
Top Speed: 80 mph

In media
In 2007, the Discovery Channel filmed Miss GEICO for an episode of their series Build It Bigger which premiered September 26. Host Danny traveled to Turbine Marine Inc. in Palm Beach, Florida where he helped the team rebuild one of their boats in order to be ready to compete in a Sarasota race. In 2009, the Miss GEICO boat was featured at all the Kentucky Derby events including Thunder over Louisville, Pegasus Parade, the Oaks and the Derby.

In the second episode of the rebooted series of American Chopper, the OCC crew were commissioned to build a motorbike in the spirit of the Miss GEICO boat.

References

External links
 Miss GEICO Racing
 AMF Offshore Racing
 Official MySpace
 Official Facebook
 Official Twitter

Racing motorboats
GEICO